Alòs de Balaguer is a municipality in the  comarca of Noguera, in the province of Lleida, Catalonia, Spain.

Alòs de Balaguer has a very scant population. With such a small population, there is an average of 2.2 people per km2 and only 5.8 people per square mile. With only one vineyard, one restaurant and the Rio Segre river nearby. The Rio Segre is up to 50+ feet deep in some spots in the middle of the river.
In Alos de Balaguer, in the Segre sector, the watercourse leaves the normal North-South direction from the South Pyrenean river and heads towards the towns and bridges of Camarasa.
The river runs through, firstly, a sector composed of tertiary sediments. This comprises the northern margin of the Central Catalan Depression to be introduced later in the Pyrenees mountains. Outside through the narrow and deep gorge (Gorge wall) on the basis of Alos de Balaguer, it then goes back to the depression of the Ebro. From Ebro, it then stretches to Camarasa-Balaguer.

References

External links
 Government data pages 

Municipalities in Noguera (comarca)
Populated places in Noguera (comarca)